Bludzie Wielkie  is a village in the administrative district of Gmina Dubeninki, within Gołdap County, Warmian-Masurian Voivodeship, in northern Poland, close to the border with the Kaliningrad Oblast of Russia.

It was formerly known as Bludszen (1928-1936), Bludschen (1936-1938 ), and Forsthausen (1938-1945).

References

Bludzie Wielkie